A Scottish or Scots acre was a land measurement used in Scotland. It was standardised in 1661. When the Weights and Measures Act of 1824 was implemented the English System was standardised into the Imperial System and Imperial acres were imposed throughout the United Kingdom, including in Scotland and indeed throughout the British Empire from that point on. However, since then the metric system has come to be used in Scotland, as in the rest of the United Kingdom..

Equivalent to:

 Metric system
 5,080 square metres , 0.508 hectares
 Imperial system
 54,760 square feet.  This is approximately 1.257 acres (English).

See also
 Acre
 Obsolete Scottish units of measurement
 In the East Highlands:
 Rood
 Scottish acre = 4 roods
 Oxgang (Damh-imir) = the area an ox could plough in a year (around 20 acres)
 Ploughgate (?) = 8 oxgangs
 Daugh (Dabhach) = 4 ploughgates
 In the West Highlands:
 Groatland - (Còta bàn) = basic unit
 Pennyland (Peighinn) = 2 groatlands
 Quarterland (Ceathramh) = 4 pennylands (8 groatlands)
 Ounceland (Tir-unga) = 4 quarterlands (32 groatlands)
 Markland (Marg-fhearann) = 8 Ouncelands (varied)

Notes

Obsolete Scottish units of measurement
Units of area